Moritz Kässmayer, sometimes spelled Käßmayer (1831, Vienna1884, Vienna) was an Austrian composer remembered for his humorous settings of folk songs for string quartet. Among the quartets' admirers was Brahms, on his visits to the Kässmayer family house. He had less success with his one comic opera performed in Vienna in 1869, Das Landhaus in Meudon.

References 

1831 births
1884 deaths
Austrian male composers
Austrian composers
19th-century composers
Musicians from Vienna
19th-century male musicians